Gilmore station may refer to:
 Gilmore station (LRT), a rapid transit station in Metro Manila, Philippines
 Gilmore station (SkyTrain), a rapid transit station in Metro Vancouver, Canada